The Margarita Island kangaroo rat (Dipodomys merriami margaritae) is a subspecies of rodent in the family Heteromyidae.

It is endemic to Mexico, where it is found only on Isla Santa Margarita of Magdalena Bay, Baja California Sur. The natural habitat of the species is hot deserts. It is threatened by predation by feral cats and dogs.

References

Margarita Island kangaroo rat
Endemic mammals of Mexico
Endemic fauna of the Baja California Peninsula
Rodents of North America
Natural history of Baja California Sur
Critically endangered biota of Mexico
Critically endangered animals
Taxonomy articles created by Polbot